Hyrachyus (from Hyrax and  "pig") is an extinct genus of perissodactyl mammal that lived in Eocene Europe, North America, and Asia. Its remains have also been found in Jamaica. It is closely related to Lophiodon.

Description
The 1.5-m-long beast was related to palaeotheres, and suspected to be the ancestor of modern tapirs and rhinoceroses. Physically, it would have looked very similar to modern tapirs, although it probably lacked the tapir's characteristic proboscis. Its teeth, however, resembled those of a rhinoceros, supporting the idea of its relationship with that group.

References

Eocene odd-toed ungulates
Transitional fossils
Paleogene mammals of Asia
Paleogene mammals of Europe
Fossil taxa described in 1871
Paleogene mammals of North America
Paleogene Jamaica
Fossils of Jamaica